Kraken IV is the name of the fourth studio album from the Colombian group Kraken   It was released on November 4, 1993, by Discos Fuentes. The first single from the album was "Lenguage de mi Piel
". The second single was "Piel de Cobre".

Track listing

References 

Kraken (band) albums
1993 albums